Reina Hispanoamericana 2018  was the 28th edition of the Reina Hispanoamericana pageant. It was held on 3 November 2018 in Santa Cruz de la Sierra, Bolivia. Teresita Marquez of the Philippines crowned Nariman Battikah of Venezuela as her successor at the end of the event.

Results

Placements

 § – voted via the Internet

Order of Announcements
Top 10

Hispanic Beauty Gala

Contestants
30 contestants competed for the title. They are: 

{| class="wikitable sortable" style="font-size: 95%;"
|-
! Country/Territory
! Name
|-
||Maria Irigaray
|-
| |Raquelle Elina Rosalia Reeberg
|-
|  
|Selene Maria Urias
|-
||Marian Joyce Prado Ribera
|-
||Isabele Pandini Nogueira
|-
||Rafaella Enderica Peña
|-
||Camila Ignacia Helfmann Pastene
|-
||Alma Beatriz Díaz Bonilla
|-
||Daniela Johnson Quirós
|-
||Gleidys Leyva Rodríguez
|-
||Dailin Viera
|-
| 
|Johanny Estefanía Ureña Billa
|-
||Lisseth Naranjo
|-
||Icela Trinidad Aparicio Villegas
|-
| 
|Daniela Santeliz
|-
||Dulce Tatiana López Villatoro
|-
||Cristina Cadet Prosper
|-
||Laurien Daniela Villafranca Gamero
|-
||Aranza Anaid Molina Rueda
|-
||Alicia Karina Ramírez Urbina
|-
||Norma Angélica Díaz Mancilla
|-
| 
|María Belén Alderete Gayoso
|-
||Micaella Alyssa Muhlach Alvarez
|-
||Ana Rita Aguiar
|-
| 
|Erika Medina Batista
|-
| 
|Magnolia María Martínez Ortuño
|-
| 
|Geraldine Alexandra Chaparro Briceño
|-
| 
|Florencia Barrios Rüsch
|-
||Nariman Cristina Battikha Yanyi
|}

NotesDebutsReturnsLast competed in 2015:Last competed in 2016:Withdrawals Cindy Guevara is one of the contestants but she withdrew because of unknown reasons.Designations Aranza Molina was designated by Lupita Jones who is the national director of Mexicana Universal. Aranza Molina is the 1st runner-up in Mexicana Universal 2018.Replacements Ivonne Cerdas was the original representative of Costa Rica in Reina Hispanoamericana 2018 but because of the change of plans, Daniela Johnson elected as the representative of Costa Rica in Reina Hispanoamericana 2018. Onelly Rosario declined to participate for unknown reasons. She was replaced by Johanna Ureña. Ana Livieres resigned due to personal issues. Belén Alderete had been elected. Belén Alderete also won the title of Miss Universo Paraguay 2018. Geyssell García would be the representative of Nicaragua but after having participated in the Face of Beauty International 2018 in which she was a Second Finalist, the contract with the aforementioned contest did not allow her to participate in another contest until the year of her reign. She was replaced by Alicia Ramírez.

Crossovers
These are the contestants who previously competed or will be competing at other international beauty pageants:
 Miss Universe
2018:  Joyce Prado
2018:  Belen Alderete

 Miss International
2019:  Ana Rita Aguiar

 Miss Supranational
2018:  Nariman Battikha (Top 10)

 Miss Model of the World
2015:  Joyce Prado

 Miss Tourism Queen of the Year International
2015:  Joyce Prado (semifinalist)

 Miss Pacific World
2015:  Maria Irigaray

 Miss Intercontinental
2016:  Icela Aparicio

 Reinado Internacional Del Cafe
2017:  Norma Diaz (2nd princess)

Miss Latin Tourism
2018:  Jessica McFarlane (Virreina)

Miss Global Beauty Queen
2016:  Isabella Pandini (3rd runner-up''')

References

Reina Hispanoamericana
2018 beauty pageants
Events in Santa Cruz de la Sierra